Walter Bagenal (c 1762 – 18 June 1814) was an Irish politician who sat in the House of Commons of the United Kingdom from 1802 to 1812.

He was elected at the 1802 general election as one of the two Members of Parliament (MPs) for Carlow County.
He was re-elected unopposed in 1806 and 1807, but was defeated at the 1812 general election.

References

External links 
 

1760s births
1814 deaths
Members of the Parliament of the United Kingdom for County Carlow constituencies (1801–1922)
UK MPs 1802–1806
UK MPs 1806–1807
UK MPs 1807–1812